Zhaoquanying Town is a town located on northwestern side of Shunyi District, Beijing. It borders Beishicao and Miaocheng Towns to its north, Niulanshan Town to its east, Mapo and Gaoliying Towns to its south, and Xingshou Town to its west. Its total population was 47,206 in 2020.

History

Administrative divisions 
In the year 2021, Zhaoquanying Town covered 26 subdivisions, including 1 community and 25 villages:

See also 

 List of township-level divisions of Beijing

References 

Towns in Beijing
Shunyi District